Ōtsuki (大月 or 大槻) is a Japanese surname. Alternative transliterations include Otsuki, Ootsuki and Ohtsuki. Notable people with the surname include:

, Japanese lexicographer, linguist, and historian
, Swedish Classical musical pianist
, Japanese kickboxer
, Japanese AV actress and idol singer
, Japanese actor
, Japanese football player and manager
, was the second wife of Sun Yat-sen
, Japanese singer
, Japanese rock musician
, Japanese singer
, a semi-regular cast on Ultraman Leo
, Japanese football player
, the perpetrator of the Hikari Parent-child Murder Incident
, founder of the third largest independent Japanese church, Holy Ecclesia of Jesus
, Japanese football player and manager
, Japanese-German actor
, Japanese footballer

Fictional characters
, a character from Umineko When They Cry
, a character from Senryu Girl
, a character from Kaiji and Mr. Tonegawa: Middle Management Blues
, a character from The Idolmaster

Japanese-language surnames